The Aeromarine 39 was an American two-seat training seaplane ordered by the US Navy in 1917 and built by the Aeromarine Plane and Motor Company of Keyport, New Jersey. Of conventional biplane configuration and construction, the aircraft was designed so that its pontoons could be speedily detached and replaced with wheeled undercarriage for shore operations.

History

Fifty of the original design (later referred to as the 39A) were produced, featuring twin floats and powered by a Hall-Scott A-7 engine. A redesign followed, increasing the wingspan to create more lift for water take-offs. This became known as the 39B. Other changes included a change to a single pontoon with outrigger floats, an enlarged vertical tail, and a change of powerplant to the Curtiss OXX.

On October 26, 1922 Godfrey DeCourcelles Chevalier landed a 39B on a moving ship, USS Langley, the first time this had been achieved on an American aircraft carrier. Trials of underway carrier takeoffs and landings continued through 1922 and 1923.

Survivors
An example of a 39B is preserved at the Old Rhinebeck Aerodrome, although it has been severely damaged by two fires, one in 1966 and one in the early 1980s.

Operators

United States Navy

Specifications (Aeromarine 39B)

References

External links

Biplanes
Single-engined tractor aircraft
1910s United States military trainer aircraft
Floatplanes
039
Aircraft first flown in 1917